George Hammond Lucy (1789–1845) was a British landowner, Member of Parliament and High Sheriff.

Early life 
He was born the son of the Rev. John Lucy, born John Hammond, of Charlecote Park, near Stratford-upon-Avon, Warwickshire and educated at Harrow School and Christ Church, Oxford. He succeeded his father to Charlecote Park in 1823.

Career 
His father bought him the Parliamentary seat at Fowey where he was elected in 1818, but then unseated on petition in 1819. Further expensive investment in the constituency enabled him to regain the seat in 1820 and retain it until 1830.

Personal life 
In 1823 he married Mary Elizabeth Williams, the daughter of Sir John Williams, 1st Baronet, of Bodelwyddan, Flintshire and with his wife undertook the restoration of a somewhat dilapidated Charlecote. He was pricked High Sheriff of Warwickshire for 1831–32.

He died in 1845 the father of 5 sons and two daughters. His portrait, painted by Friedrich von Amerling, hangs in Charlecote House, now a property of the National Trust.

References

1789 births
1845 deaths
People from Warwickshire
People educated at Harrow School
Alumni of Christ Church, Oxford
Members of the Parliament of the United Kingdom for Fowey
UK MPs 1818–1820
UK MPs 1820–1826
UK MPs 1826–1830
High Sheriffs of Warwickshire